The  is a Class B river in Tokyo and Kanagawa Prefecture which flows into the Bay of Sagami of the Pacific Ocean.

The Sakai River
The Sakai River has with the length of 52.1 km and the basin size of 210.7 square km. It starts from Aihara-machi (Japanese: 相原町), Machida, Tokyo, to Katase, Fujisawa, Kanagawa, near Enoshima Island. It is called "Sakai", meaning "border", because it flows on the border of the former provinces of Musashi and Sagami.

As the Sakai River and its tributaries are prone to flooding (especially in spring and during the typhoon season), as a protection they were encased in concrete during the postwar period. The rivers continue to flood, but do not overflow their banks as frequently as in the past.

Aliases

The river often used to be called the Takakura River because it flowed through Kōza District, Kanagawa (Japanese: 高座郡), the Kun'yomi reading of the two "Kōza" Kanji characters being Takakura. Also, the short section of the river from the point where it is joined by the Kashio River to the mouth of the river is sometimes called the Katase River.

Recreation
There are walking and bicycle routes along the banks of the Sakai River, from Machida, Tokyo, to the river mouth in Fujisawa, Kanagawa.

Mooring of pleasure boats in the river is now prohibited.

Katase River
The  is a segment of the Sakai River in Shōnan, central Japan, about 50 kilometers southwest of Tokyo. The river's name comes from Fujisawa City's Katase area through which it flows, at the foot of Kataseyama (片瀬山), and goes under the Katase Bridge of Route 134, before it meets Sagami Bay beside Katase Fisheries Port.

References

External links
 (mouth)

Rivers of Tokyo
Rivers of Kanagawa Prefecture
Rivers of Japan